Benjamin Edwin Minns (17 November 1863 – 21 February 1937) was an Australian artist, recognised as one of Australia's foremost watercolourists.

Minns was born in Dungog, New South Wales, Australia and had lessons in painting and drawing at Inverell, New South Wales. Intending to have a career in law, Minns went to Sydney and worked for the law firm Abbot & Allen. However, he met the artist Charles Conder with whom he shared a studio. Minns then studied under Lucien Henry at Sydney Technical College, also taking lessons from the plein air painter Julian Ashton.

Minns obtained his first job at the Illustrated Sydney News with Conder's help; Minns also drew for the Sydney Mail and regularly contributed to The Bulletin.
From 1895 to 1915 Minns worked in England, contributing to St Paul's Magazine, Punch, The Strand Magazine, the Bystander and other publications as well as sending drawings to The Bulletin.
Minns was a founder in 1924 and inaugural president (until 1937) of the Australian Watercolour Institute.

References

External links 

 
 

1863 births
1937 deaths
Australian watercolourists
19th-century Australian painters
19th-century Australian male artists
20th-century Australian painters
20th-century Australian male artists
Archibald Prize finalists
Australian landscape painters
Australian male painters